Lemele is a village in the Dutch province of Overijssel. It is a part of the municipality of Ommen, and lies about 20 km northwest of Almelo.

History 
It was first mentioned between 1381 and 1383 as Lemelo, and means "clay near open forest". In 1840, it was home to 258 people. In 1863, it formed a short-lived municipality with Archem.

Notable people 
 Peter Schulting (born 1987), cyclist

Gallery

References

Populated places in Overijssel
Ommen